The 2023 UConn Huskies football team will represent University of Connecticut (UConn) in the 2023 NCAA Division I FBS football season. The Huskies will be led by second-year head coach Jim L. Mora and play home games at the Pratt & Whitney Stadium at Rentschler Field in East Hartford, Connecticut.

Schedule
UConn announced their 2023 football schedule on December 22, 2022.

References

UConn
UConn Huskies football seasons
UConn Huskies